Eric Shaw may refer to:

 Eric Shaw (screenwriter) (born 1972), American television writer
 Eric Shaw (American football) (born 1971), American football player
 Eric Shaw (politician) (born 1936), Australian politician